Daniel Federspiel (born 21 April 1987) is an Austrian cross-country mountain biker, cyclo-cross and road racing cyclist, who currently rides for UCI Continental team . He specialises in the cross-country eliminator event, in which he was world champion in 2015 and 2016. He was also European champion in the cross-country eliminator in 2013 and 2014. He was given the Austrian Cyclist of the Year award in 2016.

Major results

Mountain bike

2012
 3rd  UCI World XCE Championships
2013
 1st Overall UCI XCE World Cup
1st Albstadt
1st Val di Sole
 1st  European XCE Championships
 2nd  UCI World XCE Championships
2014
 1st  European XCE Championships
 3rd Overall UCI XCE World Cup
2015
 1st  UCI World XCE Championships
2016
 1st  UCI World XCE Championships
 2nd  European XCE Championships
2017
 2nd  European XCE Championships
2018
 1st Graz, UCI XCE World Cup
2021
 1st  National XCE Championships

Cyclo-cross

2013–2014
 3rd National Championships
2016–2017
 2nd National Championships
2017–2018
 2nd National Championships
2019–2020
 1st  National Championships
2020–2021
 1st  National Championships
2021–2022
 1st  National Championships

Road
2020
 2nd Road race, National Road Championships

References

External links

Austrian male cyclists
Cross-country mountain bikers
Austrian mountain bikers
Living people
1987 births